Brendan G. Carr is an American medical doctor and professor. He is Professor and Endowed System Chair of Emergency Medicine at the Icahn School of Medicine at Mount Sinai and the Mount Sinai Health System.

Education 
Carr holds a Bachelor of Science in Psychology, a Master of Arts in Clinical Psychology from Loyola University Maryland, a MD from Temple University, and a Master of Science in Health Policy Research from The University of Pennsylvania. Carr completed residency in emergency medicine, a fellowship in Trauma and Surgical Critical Care, and the Robert Wood Johnson Foundation’s Clinical Scholar Program at The University of Pennsylvania School of Medicine.

Career 
Prior to his current role, Carr was faculty in the Department of Emergency Medicine, Department of Biostatistics and Epidemiology at The Perelman School of Medicine at University of Pennsylvania, and Senior Fellow at the Leonard Davis Institute of Health Economics. He holds editorial positions for peer-reviewed journals, has organized scientific meetings on the emergency care delivery system, mentors junior researchers, and is a thought leader in emergency care policy.

At Thomas Jefferson University, Carr was Professor and Vice Chair of Health Policy in the Department of Emergency Medicine, ran a Population Science Research Group, and was the Associate Dean of Healthcare Delivery Innovation. In this capacity, he focused on using research methods to measure the impact of healthcare delivery system innovations including the use of telehealth and other patient centered care delivery methods.

Carr was appointed as Director of the Emergency Care Coordination Center within the Office of the Assistant Secretary for Preparedness and Response (ASPR) at the Department of Health and Human Services from 2012 to 2020. There, he focused on integrating the emergency care delivery system into the broader healthcare infrastructure. Key efforts have included coordination of the government wide Council on Emergency Medical Care, partnerships with the National Quality Forum to improve the measurement of emergency care, developing an emergency care system inventory, examining access to trauma care, exploring the development of better incentives for the delivery of high quality emergency care, and partnerships with the Indian Health Service to improve emergency care.

Research 
Carr’s work has focused on how emergency care system design impacts outcomes in unplanned critical illness such as trauma, stroke, sepsis, and cardiac arrest. His research funding has focused on trauma system outcomes and planning for both adults and children, emergency systems of care, telemedicine, and the use of population based outcomes measurements in order to improve outcomes for emergency conditions.

Carr has written over 150 peer reviewed manuscripts and has served as a reviewer for over a dozen peer-reviewed journals. He received a career development award (K08) to study adult trauma systems of care from the Agency for Healthcare Research & Quality (AHRQ). He also served as Principal Investigator for several R01 and R03 research awards from AHRQ, the CDC, and the National Institutes of Health (NIH), examining trauma systems, geography of acute care, and regional cardiac arrest outcomes and systems of care.

His research focus is on understanding emergency care system design through the lens of population health. In his role at Mount Sinai, Carr has helped to develop the system-wide response to the COVID-19 pandemic, and his current research efforts seek to examine health system readiness.

Awards, honors, and positions 
Carr has received a number of awards, including the Society for Academic Emergency Medicine Young Investigator Award, the American College of Emergency Physicians Young Physician Leadership Fellowship, the Golden Apple Teaching Award from the University of Pennsylvania, Best Manuscript from the Eastern Association for the Surgery of Trauma, and Top Docs of Philadelphia. In 2022, he received the “Chair of the Year Award" from the Emergency Medicine Residents' Association (EMRA) of the American College of Emergency Physicians. He recently left the Board of Directors for the Emergency Medicine Foundation, is an active member of the Society for Academic Emergency Medicine, the American College of Emergency Physicians, and is a widely sought after speaker on issues related to emergency care and health policy. He serves on the editorial board for Annals of Emergency Medicine. In Fall 2020, Carr was elected to the National Academy of Medicine.

References

External links 
 
 
 PubMed search for Brendan G. Carr

American physicians
Icahn School of Medicine at Mount Sinai faculty

Year of birth missing (living people)
Living people
Members of the National Academy of Medicine
Thomas Jefferson University faculty
Perelman School of Medicine at the University of Pennsylvania faculty
United States Department of Health and Human Services officials